Eileen Almeida Barbosa is a Cape Verdean writer and former advisor to the Prime Minister.

She has a bachelor's degree in Tourism and Marketing. In 2005 Barbosa received the National Pantera Revelation Prize for Short Stories, as well as the Pantera Revelation Prize for Poetry. Eileenístico, a collection of short stories, was published in 2007.

In 2014, Barbosa was chosen as one of those named in the Africa39 project to showcase promising young African writers, and was included in the anthology Africa39: New Writing from Africa South of the Sahara (edited by Ellah Allfrey, 2014). One reviewer commented: "My favorite piece was Eileen Almeida Barbosa's mellifluous and passionate 'Two Fragments of Love,' and I hope more of her work is translated into English." Another reviewer referred to the story as "a soothing, lyrical piece".

References

Cape Verdean poets
Cape Verdean short story writers
Cape Verdean women short story writers
Cape Verdean women writers
Year of birth missing (living people)
Living people
Place of birth missing (living people)
Cape Verdean women poets
21st-century poets
21st-century women writers
21st-century short story writers